Ribes laxiflorum is a species of currant known by the common names trailing black currant, and spreading currant. It is native to western North America.

Description
Ribes laxiflorum is a spreading, trailing shrub usually growing  in height. It has fuzzy, glandular stems lacking spines and prickles. The inflorescence is a mostly erect raceme of up to eight flowers. The distinctive flower has five greenish, purplish, or red sepals which are often curved back at the tips. Inside the corolla are five red stamens tipped with whitish anthers.

Distribution and habitat
It is native to western North America from Alaska and Yukon south as far as northern California and New Mexico; it has also been found in Siberia. Its habitat includes moist mountain forests, open clearings, streambanks, and the borders of mountain roads.

Uses
The berries are eaten locally (variously fresh, boiled, or as preserves) by Bella Coola, Haisla, Hanaksiala, Hesquiat, Kwakiutl, Lummi, Makah, Oweekeno, Skagit, and Tanana peoples.

Other traditions use R. laxiflorum for
an infusion to make an eyewash (roots and or branches, by the Bella Coolah).

Decoctions of: bark to remedy tuberculosis (with the roots, by the Skokomish); or for the common cold (Skagit): leaves and twigs, as a general tonic (Lummi).

Woody stems are fashioned into pipe stems (Hesquiat).

References

External links

Jepson Manual Treatment
Calphotos Photo gallery, University of California

laxiflorum
Plants described in 1813
Flora of North America
Flora of Russia
Plants used in Native American cuisine
Plants used in traditional Native American medicine